Vittore Gottardi (24 September 1941 – 18 December 2015) was a Swiss football midfielder who played for Switzerland in the 1966 FIFA World Cup.

Club career
He also played for FC Lugano, Bellinzona, Lausanne and Rapid Lugano. He won the Swiss Cup with Lausanne in 1964 and with Lugano in 1968, but was on the losing side in the 1969 Cup final with Bellinzona.

International career
Gottardi made his debut for Switzerland in a July 1966 FIFA World Cup match against Spain and earned a total of 4 caps, scoring no goals. His final international was a January 1967 friendly match against Mexico.

Honours
Swiss Cup (2): 1964, 1968

References

External links
FIFA profile

1941 births
2015 deaths
People from Lugano District
Association football midfielders
Swiss men's footballers
Switzerland international footballers
1966 FIFA World Cup players
FC Lugano players
FC Lausanne-Sport players
AC Bellinzona players
Sportspeople from Ticino